The Journal of Microwave Power and Electromagnetic Energy is a quarterly peer-reviewed scientific journal covering industrial, medical, and scientific applications of electromagnetic and microwaves from 0.1 to 100 GHz, including topics such as food processing, instrumentation, polymer technologies, and systems design.

The journal is published by the International Microwave Power Institute. The editor-in-chief is Eli Jerby (Tel Aviv University).

Electrical and electronic engineering journals
Quarterly journals
English-language journals
Microwave technology